is a remix album by Japanese singer/songwriter Chisato Moritaka, released on July 10, 1991 to coincide with the fifth anniversary of her entertainment career. The album includes two new tracks: "Mijikai Natsu" and "Kanojo", as well as remixes and re-recordings of Moritaka's previous singles. A limited edition release included a 32-page photo book.

The album peaked at No. 2 on Oricon's albums chart and sold over 353,000 copies. It was also certified Platinum by the RIAJ in March 1993.

The Moritaka was reissued on double-LP by Warner Music Japan on November 3, 2017. It is also offered in the limited edition Blu-ray boxed set of The Moritaka Tour 1991.8.22 at Shibuya Public Hall.

Track listing 
All lyrics are written by Chisato Moritaka, except where indicated; all music is composed and arranged by Hideo Saitō, except where indicated.

Personnel 
 Chisato Moritaka – vocals
 Hideo Saitō – all instruments, programming, backing vocals (all tracks except where indicated)
 Yuichi Takahashi – guitar, synthesizer, programming, backing vocals (3)
 Yasuaki Maejima – keyboards, backing vocals (6, 10), piano (13)
 Shin Kōno – keyboards, backing vocals (6, 10), organ (13)
 Ken Shima – piano (3)
 Hirokuni Korekata – guitar (3)
 Hiroyoshi Matsuo – guitar (6, 10, 13)
 Ojisan – guitar solo (13)
 Masafumi Yokoyama – bass, backing vocals (6, 10, 13)
 Makoto Yoshihara – drums (6, 10)
 Teruo Goto – tenor saxophone (3)
 Seiji Matsuura – backing vocals (4)

Charts

Certification

References

External links 
  (Chisato Moritaka)
  (Warner Music Japan)
 
 

1991 remix albums
Chisato Moritaka compilation albums
Japanese-language compilation albums
Warner Music Japan compilation albums